Josefina is a female name, a feminine form of Joseph. It may refer to:

Josefina Passadori, Argentine writer
Josefina Lopez, Chicana playwright
Josefina Pla,  Spanish poet, playwright, art critic, painter and journalist
Josefina Ayerza, writer and a psychoanalyst 
Josefina Deland, Swedish feminist
Josefina Muñoz, Chilean artist
Josefina Wettergrund, Swedish writer

Fiction
Josefina LaCosta, a fictional character in the Richard Sharpe series of novels by Bernard Cornwell.
Josefina, Gil Harris' fake girlfriend in the 2002 teen comedy The New Guy
Josefina Menendez, a fictional character in the 2012 first-person shooter Call of Duty: Black Ops II.
Josefina Montoya, the fictional main character of the American Girl Josefina stories

Places
Josefina, Zamboanga del Sur
Josefina (Santa Fe), a commune in the Castellanos Department, Argentina.

See also 

 Josephina (disambiguation)
 Josephine (disambiguation)

Spanish feminine given names

br:Josefina